Heartstopper is a British coming-of-age romantic comedy-drama television series on Netflix, adapted from the webcomic and graphic novel of the same name by Alice Oseman. Written by Oseman herself, the series primarily tells the story of Charlie Spring (Joe Locke), a gay schoolboy who falls in love with classmate Nick Nelson (Kit Connor), whom he sits next to in his new form. It also explores the lives of Tao (William Gao), Elle (Yasmin Finney), Tara (Corinna Brown) and Darcy (Kizzy Edgell).

The television rights for the series were purchased by See-Saw Films in 2019, and Netflix acquired distribution rights in 2021. Euros Lyn was enlisted as the director. Filming took place from April to June that year, with teasers released throughout the timeframe. Various pre-existing songs were used as the series' soundtrack, in addition to an original score by Adiescar Chase. The cinematographic styles and colour grading were planned ahead to give the series atmospheric elegance, amplified by the use of traditional animation adapted from the source material.

Heartstopper was released on 22 April 2022. It received critical acclaim, particularly for its tone and pacing, as well as its portrayal of LGBT people, and the first season received nine nominations and five wins for the inaugural ceremony of the Children's and Family Emmy Awards. It gained instant popularity, being among the top 10 English series on Netflix in just two days. It also increased the popularity of the graphic novels as well as the series' songs. On 20 May 2022, it was announced that Heartstopper had been renewed for a second and third season.

Cast and characters

Main

 Kit Connor as Nick Nelson, a popular year 11 rugby player at Truham Grammar School seated next to Charlie in form class
 Joe Locke as Charlie Spring, a year 10 student at Truham Grammar School who was recently outed
 William Gao as Tao Xu, Charlie's protective best friend
 Yasmin Finney as Elle Argent, Charlie, Tao and Isaac's friend who transferred to Higgs Girls School after she came out as transgender
 Corinna Brown as Tara Jones, a Higgs student who befriends Elle
 Kizzy Edgell as Darcy Olsson, Tara's girlfriend and a friend of Elle's
 Tobie Donovan as Isaac Henderson, a quiet member of Charlie, Tao, and Elle's friend group
 Jenny Walser as Tori Spring, Charlie's older sister
 Sebastian Croft as Benjamin "Ben" Hope, Charlie's first, clandestine relationship
 Cormac Hyde-Corrin as Harry Greene, a boy on the rugby team who is a homophobic bully
 Rhea Norwood as Imogen Heaney, one of Nick's friends who has a crush on him
 Fisayo Akinade as Mr Ajayi, an art teacher who looks out for Charlie
 Chetna Pandya as Coach Singh, the rugby coach who looks out for Charlie
 Stephen Fry as the voice of Headmaster Barnes, the head teacher of Truham Grammar School
 Olivia Colman as Sarah Nelson, Nick's mother

Recurring
 Araloyin Oshunremi as Otis Smith
 Evan Ovenell as Christian McBride
 Ashwin Viswanath as Sai Verma
 Georgina Rich as Jane Spring, Charlie and Tori's mother
 Joseph Balderrama as Julio Spring, Charlie and Tori's father
 Momo Yeung as Yan Xu, Tao's mother
 Alan Turkington as Mr Lange

Series overview 
<onlyinclude>

Episodes

Production

Writing and pre-production
In 2016, Alice Oseman started a webcomic titled Heartstopper which later expanded to a graphic novel after gaining a cult following. Sometime in 2019, See-Saw Films asked Oseman if she could try writing a screenplay. The production company had been suggested by its own executive producer Patrick Walters, who helped with Oseman's Kickstarter campaign in 2018. She expressed interest in doing it, noting the lack of wholesome, teenage LGBT representation on television, hoping that this could potentially assure LGBT youth "that they can find happiness and find romance and find friendship". She wrote a screenplay based on the first two volumes of the graphic novel. See-Saw Films liked it and optioned the television rights later that July.

On 20 January 2021, it was revealed that Netflix had ordered Heartstopper as an eight-episode half-hour series. It was deemed the best platform by Oseman and Walters due to its global availability. Euros Lyn was enlisted as director and executive producer. He had not read the original source material and called the screenplay riveting. Netflix "Kids & Family content" director Patrick Wheeleer said that the story "deserves to be told" due to its relatability among the young demographic. Walters served as executive producer for the series, alongside Jamie Laurenson, Hakan Kousetta, Iain Canning, and Emile Sherman, with Zorana Piggott as producer. Production design was done by Tim Dickel, series set decoration by Maxwell Fine and props by Zoe Seiffert. During production, the programme had a working title of Evergreen.

Casting 
To provide an authentic depiction, Oseman wanted actual young people to portray the characters. Daniel Edwards-Guy served as casting director. An open casting call went out in January and February 2021 for five of the main characters as well as three of the recurring cast. Oseman explained that the character Aled Last would not appear in the adaptation to respect his story in another novel within the Heartstopper universe, Radio Silence. After over 10,000 people auditioned via Zoom, she announced the first round of casting decisions in April 2021, with Kit Connor and Joe Locke starring as Nick and Charlie respectively. Heartstopper marked Locke's acting debut. After agreeing that Locke suited Charlie's role, Connor was auditioned and the production team found a chemistry between the two; the actors themselves recalled only taking a few hours to bond.

The rest of the cast members were announced days later and included Yasmin Finney, Sebastian Croft, William Gao, Corinna Brown, Kizzy Edgell, Cormac Hyde-Corrin, Rhea Norwood, and Tobie Donovan. Jenny Walser joined in the cast in May 2021. The final audition was conducted face-to-face. Having worked with her previously, Lyn reached out to Olivia Colman after Oseman expressed an interest in a notable actress to portray Sarah; Colman accepted the offer. It was also noted that fans of the webcomic and graphic novel agreed that Colman was suited for the series. Lyn said that Colman's "instinctive" and "warm" character fit Sarah as Nick's mother.

On 8 July 2022, an open casting call was announced for a 16-year-old character named Sahar Zahid, a British female or non-binary of South Asian descent. That September, it was announced that Leila Khan would play the role and much of the lead cast would return for the second season. Other roles announced included Jack Barton as David Nelson, Nick's older brother; Bradley Riches as Truham student James McEwan; and Nima Taleghani as schoolteacher Mr Farouk. On 4 November 2022, it was announced that Colman, Chetna Pandya, Fisayo Akinade, and Alan Turkington would reprise their roles in the second season, along with new casting including Bel Priestley and Ash Self as Elle's new friends Naomi and Felix, and Thibault de Montalembert as Nick's father Stephane.

Filming

Filming began on location throughout the United Kingdom in April 2021 and finished that June. It mostly took place in Berkshire and Buckinghamshire. Harry's party was filmed at the Hampton Court House in the London Borough of Richmond upon Thames. A Hollywood Bowl bowling alley in High Wycombe was used for filming. The rugby match shown in the episode "Secret" was filmed at the Thames Valley Athletics Centre. The railway station from where Nick and Charlie depart to the seaside is North Weald railway station in Essex, and the scene on the seaside was filmed in Herne Bay, Kent. After milkshakes, Charlie and his friends are seen walking along the River Thames in Windsor, Berkshire, before their concert. Colman filmed all her scenes in two days. In the episode "Boyfriend", during a scene where Nick and Charlie take a train, Oseman decided to give herself a cameo as a passenger; she is drawing the couple nearby. The scene near the end of the episode featuring a merry-go-round was filled with crew members.

Diana Olifirova was enlisted as cinematographer. She was immediately presented with challenges in visually depicting "love and emotion and tenderness". Using an Arri Alexa Mini LF with Canon K35 spherical lenses, she used hand-held cinematography to give the cast space and to achieve an effect that resembled the documentary genre. With production designer Tim Dickel, they conceived a light-hearted colour palette of orange, yellow, turquoise, as well as a mix of pink and blue. Olifrova employed colour gel for the lighting, which she had previously done for We Are Lady Parts. The colours of the school building were controlled to not be overdone but, at the same time, to be vivid. The scenes during Harry's birthday party were filmed in daytime, and thus the production team had to shut the windows and use artificial lighting to resemble outdoor lights. Transitions between seasons were achieved through lens flares. The opening scene was achieved in two takes; in the first, the depth of field for Nick achieved through the Contrazoom was deemed overdone; they later managed to reshoot the scene to make it more minimalistic. As Tara and Darcy kiss in the third episode, Nick is bathed in bisexual lighting (pinks, purples, and blues) symbolising him realising his sexuality; this was suggested to Olifirova by the series' creative team.

As production designer, Dickel worked with set decorator Maxwell Fine, who used his experience in past art lessons to create a realistic representation of British classrooms. Dickel, meanwhile, asked his friends to photograph their kids' rooms, creating a mood board, which was reviewed by the cast. Some of the set objects also changed as the characters progressed and grew. At the geography classroom, Nick's seat was located to have him in front of images of rocks; Fine correlated this with metamorphic rocks forming under pressure, symbolising Nick and Charlie's romantic development. Nick has his room littered with items representing his complicated life. Elle's room is "more refined" and artistic, Tao's room was designed to reflect his cinephilia, and Tara's is awash with teddy bears per the screenplay. With respect to the source material, several set objects were given a hand-drawn style. Reflective of the characters, Charlie's room is wide and chaotic, while Nick's is tidier. Oseman drew murals to be depicted in the series; they were inspired by the works of Hokusai and Julian Opie.

The second season began filming in September 2022 at Twickenham Studios, London, and finished in early December the same year.

Post-production 
In the series, traditionally animated leaves float around during moments of love, a direct copy of the visual motifs in the webcomic. In Nick and Charlie's first kissing scene, sparks of electricity come out as Charlie tries touching Nick's hand. Animated seagulls and lovebirds are also seen. Oseman said that the animations represent a "feeling of magic" they intended to evoke. She had already thought of using such effects while writing the screenplay, conceiving that they would appear primarily during the intimate scenes between Nick and Charlie, which she dubbed "Heartstopper moments". Eventually, Anna Peronetto was chosen to create the animations, using a storyboard by Oseman. Peronetto had been a fan of the original source material and was chosen when Oseman made an Instagram post looking for traditional animators. She discussed with Lyn and editor Sofie Alonzi to see what kinds of animations fit in a certain scene. For the lovebirds, she analysed London feral parakeets.

Using DaVinci Resolve, Olifirova worked remotely with colourist Toby Tomkins, working for the company Cheat, to create a 3D lookup table (LUT) that resembled the shots' colour palette, as well as "add[ing] a hint of turquoise in the shadows and warmth to skin tones". Lyn had told them he wanted the colour intensity to increase as the story progressed and as seasons changed. They talked about how to create a proper Dolby Vision high dynamic range for the series, establishing colour and tonal limits. Then, the LUT's brightness was stopped down by one so that Olifirova could create additional light in the shadows and experiment with the colour grading. To enhance the HDR, an RGB colour space of DCI-P3 was chosen. Tomkins worked on the first two episodes for two days before working on individual remaining episodes for a day-and-a-half.

Adiescar Chase composed the score and employed electronic riffs to give it a contemporary feel. Heartstopper marks her first project after graduating from the National Film and Television School. She read the webcomic prior to composing and was given direction to have her music complement the pre-existing songs used. Some of the tracks, including the titular one, aided the "Heartstopper moments" by further emphasizing the feeling of electricity and excitement.

Renewal 
When asked whether there would be a second season, Walters said that they were looking forward to it, seeing that the executives of Netflix seemed to "understand" the series. Locke and Connor had also expressed anticipation for a renewal, noting the narrative progression in the series' source material. On 20 May 2022, following Netflix's review of the 28-day viewing figures, it was announced that the series had been renewed for two more seasons. Season 2 began production in late 2022 and a release date is to be announced.

Release
Heartstopper one-minute teaser was released on 16 March 2022. Collider then announced that its tagline was: "Boy meets boy. Boys become friends. Boys fall in love." Hilary Remley, who wrote the news, saw the teaser as teasing the series' "emotionally vulnerable" air, "showing the experience of teenage love in a direct and sincere way", assured that audiences will enjoy the final product due to its faithfulness to the source material's dreamlike aesthetic. The series' episode titles were released on 19 April, before the series' episodes were released on 22 April 2022.

Soundtrack 
A selection of songs used in the soundtrack for the series were released digitally on Spotify under the title Heartstopper: Official Mixtape to coincide with the series' release on 22 April 2022. Chase's score was also released on the same day. A single by British artist Baby Queen, "Colours of You", was released by Polydor Records in conjunction with the launch. Other popular songs featured in the series include "Girls" by Girl in Red and "Tired" by Beabadoobee.

Reception

Audience viewership
During its debut week, Heartstopper ranked at number seven on Netflix's Top 10 TV English titles just two days after its release. Based on Netflix's methodology of measuring a programme by the number of hours, the series generated 14.55million hours viewed. The following week, the show climbed to number 5 with 23.94million hours viewed. In its third week, the show dropped to sixth position with new viewership numbers of 14.97million viewing hours. Variety reported the series had reached Netflix's Top Ten list in 54 countries as of 20 May 2022. The series also topped the publication's Trending TV chart for over five weeks, judging by the 1.3million Twitter engagements. The show appeared in the Top 10 list in three countries where same-sex relations are illegal (Lebanon, Saudi Arabia, and Sri Lanka).

Critical response
The series received critical acclaim. The review aggregator website Rotten Tomatoes reported a "Certified Fresh" 100% approval rating with an average rating of 8.7/10, based on 55 critic reviews. The website's critical consensus reads: "An inclusive romance told with striking sensitivity, Heartstopper is so effortlessly charming that viewers won't dare skip a beat." Metacritic, which uses a weighted average, assigned a score of 85 out of 100 based on nine critics, indicating "universal acclaim".

Reviewing the series for The Guardian, Rebecca Nicholson gave a rating of 4/5 and said, "Heartstopper may not quite live up to the dramatic promise of its title, but this adorable teen romance is a heartwarmer, at the very least." Saloni Gajjar of The A.V. Club gave the series an A− and said "Thankfully, Heartstopper subverts notions by keeping its protagonist proudly gay: It's the love interest who has to sort through his unexpected feelings, not the other way around. Nick's attraction to Charlie catches him by surprise (but not disdain)." Digital Spy David Opie gave a rating of 5/5 and said, "Heartstopper centres queer love, affirming the feelings of young people watching who might be unsure or afraid to speak their truth." Jonathan Wilson of Ready Steady Cut gave a rating of 4/5 and stated, "Heartstopper might lack some edge and feel as if it's speaking to a younger demographic than the usual teen drama, but its deeply uplifting portrait of young love is very difficult not to get swept up in." For Paste Magazine, Emily Maskell gave a rating of 8.8/10 and said, "An open-armed embrace for queer youth, Heartstopper lays the strong foundations of what you can only hope will be the uplifting and inclusive depictions of queer characters for the next generation of viewers." Ezelle Alblas for The Upcoming gave a 5/5 rating and said, "Heartstopper feels like a show everyone needs to see. It's sweet without the cheese and quietly radical without the shock factor of shows like Sex Education, Euphoria or It's a Sin."

Heartstopper was ranked the best show of 2022 by NME and The Mary Sue. Meanwhile, Entertainment.ie placed it at number four, TVLine at number eight, Decider at number nine, and PopBuzz at number 10, while The Austin Chronicle and Lifehacker included it in their respective unranked list. In addition, Collider named it one of the best new TV shows of 2022.

Impact
Following the release of the series, the first volume of Oseman's Heartstopper graphic novel became the top-selling children's bestseller in the UK. Songs featured in the series received large increases in chart sales and streams. Songs on the soundtrack that received a surge in chart sales when compared to the previous week included "Want Me" and "Dover Beach" by Baby Queen, "Why Am I Like This?" by Orla Gartland, and "I Belong In Your Arms" by Chairlift.

Accolades

References

External links

 
 

2020s high school television series
2020s teen drama television series
2020s romantic drama television series
2020s British teen television series
2020s British LGBT-related drama television series
2020s British romance television series
2022 British television series debuts
British high school television series
British teen drama television series
English-language Netflix original programming
Coming-of-age television shows
Bisexuality-related television series
Gay-related television shows
Television series about teenagers
Television shows based on webcomics
Television shows set in Kent
Television shows shot in Kent
Transgender-related television shows
Lesbian-related television shows
Children's and Family Emmy Award winners
Articles containing video clips